The Story of Jacob and Joseph is a 1974 American Biblical drama television film directed by Michael Cacoyannis, based on the Biblical Book of Genesis with a screenplay written by Ernest Kinoy. It stars Keith Michell as Jacob, Tony Lo Bianco as Joseph, Colleen Dewhurst as Rebekah, Herschel Bernardi as Laban, Harry Andrews as Isaac, and Julian Glover as Esau.

Filmed on location in Israel, The Story of Jacob and Joseph originally aired in the United States on the American Broadcasting Company on April 7, 1974. It was the fifth-highest viewed prime time program for the week.  The Biblical narrative was continued two years later with The Story of David (1976), also produced for ABC-TV and involving many of the same cast and crew.

Plot summary
This film is the narrative of two Biblical patriarchs: Jacob (Israel) and the favorite among Jacob's 12 sons, Joseph. Part I, The Story of Jacob, details the story of Jacob fleeing his tribe after cheating his brother Esau out of his birthright, getting cheated himself in his exile years, and learning of the need to make amends. Part II, The Story of Joseph and his Brothers, is of the story of Jacob's favourite son, Joseph. Betrayed and sold into slavery by his brothers, he meets and overcomes adversity to become the prime minister of Egypt, closest official to the Pharaoh himself.

Cast
 Keith Michell as Jacob
 Tony Lo Bianco as Joseph
 Colleen Dewhurst as Rebekah
 Herschel Bernardi as Laban
 Harry Andrews as Isaac
 Julian Glover as Esau
 Yosef Shiloach as Pharaoh 
 Yossi Graber as Butler
 Yona Elian as Rachel
 Rachel Shore as Potiphar's Wife
 Amnon Meskin as Baker
 Bennes Mardenn as Potiphar (credited as Bennes Maarden)
 Zila Carni as Leah (credited as Zila Karney)
 Yehuda Efroni as Reuben
 Shmuel Atzmon as Judah
 Eli Cohen as Gad
 Moti Baharav as Dan
 Ilan Dar as Simeon
 Menahem Einy as Benjamin
 Alan Bates as Narrator

References

External links
 

American television films
1974 television films
Films based on the Book of Genesis
Films directed by Michael Cacoyannis
Films shot in Israel
Films scored by Mikis Theodorakis
Cultural depictions of Joseph (Genesis)
1974 films